Kojić may refer to:

 Dragan Kojić Keba (born 1956 or 1960), Serbian singer
 Igor Kojić (born 1987), Serbian footballer
 Milan Kojić (born 1976), Canadian footballer
 Nemanja Kojić (athlete) (born 1994), Serbian track athlete
 Nemanja Kojić (footballer) (born 1990), Serbian footballer
 Nemanja Kojić (musician) (born 1975), Serbian musician better known by his stage name Hornsman Coyote (or Kojot)
 Rajko Kojić (1956–1997), Serbian guitarist

Serbian surnames